In the Socialist Autonomous Province of Vojvodina, which was at the time one of the two socialist autonomous provinces of the Socialist Republic of Serbia and one of the federal units of the Socialist Federal Republic of Yugoslavia, a single-party system was in place. During this time there were six heads of state, all from the ranks of the League of Communists of Yugoslavia (SKJ). The federal party was organized into six sub-organizations - the republic parties, one for each of the six federal republics. Vojvodinian politicians and presidents of the presidency of the period were members of the League of Communists of Yugoslavia through their membership in the League of Communists of Vojvodina (SKV), the Vojvodinian part of the federal party (as was respectively the case with all Yugoslav politicians).

See also
 List of local rulers of Vojvodina
 President of the Government of Vojvodina
 President of the Assembly of Vojvodina

References

Government of Yugoslavia
Vojvodina
Presidents
Presidents
Presidents